Obaidullah Hamzah (born 1972) is a Bangladeshi Islamic scholar, educator and economist. He is the sixth Director-General of Al Jamia Al Islamia Patiya and the head of its Arabic department. He is also the secretary-general of the Bangladesh Tahfizul Quran Organisation, a member of the Social Islami Bank's sharia supervisory committee, assistant editor of the Bengali monthly At-Tawhid and the chief editor of Arabic magazine Balagh ash-Sharq.

Early life and education 
Hamzah was born in 1972, to a Bengali Muslim family in the village of Digalia-Palang in Ukhia, Cox's Bazar, Bangladesh. His father's name was Amir Hamzah. Hamzah completed his initial education at the Digalia-Palang Qasimul Uloom Madrasa before proceeding to study at  Al Jamia Al Islamia Patiya where he completed his Masters in Hadith studies. He received first class at the central examinations from the Anjuman-e-Ittehad al-Madaris examination board. In 1992, he gained first class from the Hadith exams by Befaqul Madarisil Arabia. The following year, he completed his studies of Bengali literature and research department from the Patiya madrasa.

Career 
After completing his education, Hamzah started his career as a teacher of Hadith at the Dar as-Sunnah Madrasa in Cox's Bazar. Between 1994 and 2000, Hamzah was employed as a teacher and translator under the Saudi ministries of religious affairs and defence. In 2001, he became a teacher at Al Jamia Al Islamia Patiya. From 2003 to 2005, he was the host of an Islamic radio programme in South Africa. In 2008, he took participated in the interfaith dialogue held in Mecca. Hamzah toured Thailand in 2012, where he gave speeches in 30 different colleges, Islamic institutions, radio stations and Thai Muslim TV. In 2013, Hamzah took part in an International Humanities Law Course in Beirut, Lebanon which was a part of a joint venture by the Arab League and International Red Cross and Red Crescent Movement. He became a member of the Social Islami Bank's sharia board in 2013. Hamzah has also held the role of khatib at the Halishahar A-Block Central Mosque. After the death of Rahmatullah Kawthar Nizami on 13 August 2019, Hamzah was elected as the next secretary-general of the Bangladesh Tahfizul Quran Organisation. During a shura at Al Jamia Al Islamia Patiya on 25 August 2020, Hamzah was appointed as the assistant-director of the madrasa. After Abdul Halim Bukhari's death in 2022,  Hamzah was nominated as the acting director-general, and subsequently the director-general on 7 July 2022.

Honours 

 On 22 August 2018, the Muslim World League published a work on kindness and benevolence in Islam. Articles written by Islamic scholars from 64 countries were accepted, and from that, 8 articles were nominated to be a part of the official publication. Among the 8 published articles, the article presented in the first session was written by Obaidullah Hamzah. Hamzah was awarded in the conference and invited to Hajj.

Publications 
Hamzah is the chief editor of the Arabic magazine Balagh ash-Sharq and the assistant editor of the Bengali monthly magazine At-Tawhid. Among his written and edited books are:

 English

 Charity in Islam: Benefits and Excellences.
 Human Dignity and Dead Body Management in Islam

 Bengali

 Quran and Modern Science
 Endangered Women
 Islam vs. Terrorism
 Muslim world exposed to the naked touch of Christianity
 Guide of Islam in child rearing
 Love of Prophet vs. Insult
 Business vs. Interest: Perspectives on the Muslim World
 Terrorism: Causes and Remedies
 Human rights: Contribution of Prophet Mohammad pubh.
 Our Youth: Context Facebook
 Poverty is a Danger, the Road to Zakat Free
 Yaba's terrible paw: Target Bangladesh
 Dignity and rights of the Prophet (peace be upon him) in the light of the Qur'an
 Women: Come back in the shadow of hijab
 Dignity of knowledge and contribution of Ulema-e Deoband
 Islamic Culture vs. Subculture

See also 

 Abdur Rahman Chatgami

References 

Living people
Hanafi fiqh scholars
Director general of Al Jamia Al Islamia Patiya
Al Jamia Al Islamia Patiya alumni
People from Cox's Bazar District
Bangladeshi economists
Bangladeshi educators
Hanafis
Deobandis
1972 births
21st-century Bengalis
21st-century Muslim scholars of Islam
20th-century Muslim scholars of Islam
Bangladeshi Sunni Muslim scholars of Islam